Rambani may refer to:
 anything of, from, or related to Ramban district, a region of India
 Rambani dialect, spoken in the district

Language and nationality disambiguation pages